The WeBuyCars Dome, previously known as the Ticketpro Dome, Coca-Cola Dome, MTN Sundome or simply The Dome at Northgate, is an defunct indoor arena and car showroom located in Johannesburg, South Africa. The showroom accommodates over 1,000 vehicles and covers about 11,000 square metres. The Dome opened on 8 April 1998 with a concert by Diana Ross in front of a 15,000 strong audience. Nelson Mandela made a surprise appearance on stage during the official opening. The arena closed on 7 September 2021 due to being sold; as of March 2022, it is now used as a car showroom.

Location

The Ticketpro Dome is situated adjacent to Northgate Shopping Centre on the corner of Olievenhout Avenue and Northumberland Road, in the suburb North Riding, a short distance west of the N1/Western Bypass highway.

The venue is 45 km from O. R. Tambo International Airport, 16 km from Lanseria Airport and 20 km from the Sandton business centre.

Historical events

On 8 May 2005, Avril Lavigne held a concert Bonez Tour in support of her second studio album, Under My Skin.

On 20 May 2001, Irish vocal pop band Westlife held a concert for their Where Dreams Come True Tour supporting their album Coast to Coast.

On 25 October 2015, South African hip hop recording artist Cassper Nyovest announced that tickets to his upcoming show at the venue titled #FillUpTheDome had sold out. He is the first South African hip hop act to accomplish this feat.

On 1 and 2 May 2016, American pop-R&B diva Mariah Carey performed at the Dome for The Sweet Sweet Fantasy Tour.

On 5 August 2017, the NBA Africa Game was held at the Dome.

From 18 to 21 July 2018, American singer-songwriter Katy Perry performed at the Dome as part of her Witness: The Tour.

On 13–14 April 2019, British singer Sam Smith performed at the dome as part of their The Thrill of It All Tour.

See also 
Fourways Mall

References

External links
 Official website
 Ticketpro website

Defunct indoor arenas
Defunct basketball venues
Indoor arenas in South Africa
Covered stadiums
Buildings and structures in Johannesburg
Event venues established in 1998
Event venues disestablished in 2021
1998 establishments in South Africa
2021 disestablishments in South Africa
Sports venues in Johannesburg